Gordon Karl Fetterplace OAM was a member of the Campbelltown council from 1968 and Mayor of Campbelltown, New South Wales, from 1986 to 1992. He died of cancer 74 on 28 March, 2008.

Family 
Marrying his wife Barbara in 1956, the two had 10 children and 26 grandchildren. The two met in Campbelltown in 1961 when he opened the Bus Stop Pharmacy in Queen Street.

Community work 

Fetterplace was a strong supporter of rugby and aided the development of the sport in the Campbelltown region, serving on the board of the Western Suburbs Leagues Club between 1994 and 1999. He was re-elected in 2002, serving a further five years in the capacity of Director. Fetterplace was also the patron of the Campbelltown Show Society. Gordon became a well known personality in Campbelltown; volunteering his services in a variety of ways including to the local fire brigade and the Campbelltown Catholic Club. Mr. Fetterplace's community service also reached to St Gregory's Catholic College and charitable groups across the region. He retired from public life in 2007.

Political work 

Fetterplace served on the Campbelltown City Council for 23 years, as well as 7 terms as mayor. In 1981 and 1984 Fetterplace sought election to the Capital Territory Legislative Assembly, competing for the seat of Camden. Fetterplace pushed for better housing in the Campbelltown area, and provided governmental support for community based initiatives. After suffering a heart attack in April 1992, he retired from local government.

Recognition 

In 1994 Gordon was awarded the Medal of the Order of Australia for his services to Campbelltown. In 2000 he was awarded the National Medal. The Wests Leagues Club rugby association awards a Gordon Fetterplace Medal.

References

External links 
 Campbelltown Council Website

2008 deaths
Mayors of places in New South Wales
New South Wales local councillors
1930s births
20th-century Australian politicians